Parvardigar is a Persian name of God.

Parvardigar may also refer to:
 O' Parvardigar (album) – a 2001 EP by Pete Townshend